B flow may refer to:
B-flow mode of medical ultrasonography
B'Flow, stage name of Brian Mumba Kasoka Bwembya, a dancehall and hip hop artist